Wallyford railway station is a railway station serving the town of Wallyford, East Lothian near Musselburgh in Scotland. It was opened by Railtrack in 1994 and is served by trains on the North Berwick Line.

Early history 
There was a short lived station on the site which was opened by the North British Railway in June 1866 and closed in October 1867.

Facilities
The station is unstaffed, but a ticket machine is provided in the waiting shelter on platform 2 to allow intending passengers to buy before boarding or for collecting pre-paid tickets.  A shelter is also provided on platform 1.  Train running information is offered via CIS screens, customer help points, automated announcements and timetable poster boards.  Step-free access to each platform is available via ramps from the nearby road and car park.

Services 

Monday to Friday, there is an hourly service in each direction (half-hourly during morning and evening peaks, with a limited through service to/from ). Evenings and Sundays, there is an hourly service in each direction.

References

External links
RAILSCOT- Wallyford

Railway stations in East Lothian
Railway stations served by ScotRail
Railway stations in Great Britain opened in 1994
Railway stations opened by Railtrack
1994 establishments in Scotland
Wallyford